Currituck County Schools is a PK–12 graded school district serving Currituck County, North Carolina. Its ten schools serve 3,979 students as of the 2010–11 school year.

Student demographics
For the 2010–11 school year, Currituck County Schools had a total population of 3,979 students and 249.93 teachers on a (FTE) basis. This produced a student-teacher ratio of 1592:1. That same year, out of the student total, the gender ratio was 51% male to 49% female. The demographic group makeup was: White, 78%; Black, 5%; Hispanic, 4%; American Indian, 0%; and Asian/Pacific Islander, 0% (two or more races: 13%). For the same school year, 35.06% of the students received free and reduced-cost lunches.

Governance
The primary governing body of Currituck County Schools follows a council–manager government format with a five-member Board of Education appointing a Superintendent to run the day-to-day operations of the system. The school system resides in the North Carolina State Board of Education's First District.

Board of Education
The five members of the Board of Education generally meet on the first Thursday of each month. , the members of the board were: Karen Etheridge (Chairman), Dwan Craft (Vice Chairman), Bill Dobney, Janet Rose, and Kelly Williams Peters.

Superintendent
The superintendent of the system is Dr. Matt Lutz. He began in August 2020, replacing the former superintendent Mark Stefanik who resigned to take a position with Tipp County Schools in Ohio.

Member schools
Currituck County Schools has ten schools ranging from pre-kindergarten to twelfth grade. Those ten schools are separated into one Early College, onehigh school, two middle schools, six elementary schools.

High schools
 Currituck County High School (Barco)
 J. P. Knapp Early College (Currituck)

Middle schools
 Currituck County Middle School (Barco)
 Moyock Middle School (Moyock)

Elementary schools
 Central Elementary School (Barco)
 Jarvisburg Elementary School (Jarvisburg)
 Knotts Island Elementary School (Knotts Island)
 Moyock Elementary School (Moyock)
 Shawboro Elementary School (Shawboro)
 W. T. Griggs Elementary (Poplar Branch)

Athletics
According to the North Carolina High School Athletic Association, for the 2012–2013 school year:
 Currituck County High is a 2A school in the Northeastern Coastal Conference.
 J. P. Knapp Early College does not have athletic teams.

See also
List of school districts in North Carolina

References

External links
 

Education in Currituck County, North Carolina
School districts in North Carolina